Puzhudhivakkam also called Puzhuthivakkam, is a suburb/industrial area located North of Chennai, a metropolitan city in Tamil Nadu, India. Puzhudhivakkam almost occupied by industries such as North Chennai Thermal Power Station, Ennore Port and Kattupalli Port with no residential population.

Administration
It is a revenue village part of Kattupalli village panchayat in Minjur block. It is administered by Ponneri taluk of Tiruvallur district.

Location
Puzhudhivakkam is located in between Ennore, Pazhaverkadu and Minjur in North of Chennai. The arterial road in Puzhudhivakkam is Port access road (Ennore - Pazhaverkadu road).
It is just located outside the north limit of Chennai Metropolitan area.

References

External links
CMDA Official Webpage

Neighbourhoods in Chennai